Hazelden is a surname. Notable people with the surname include:

Hedley Hazelden (1915–2001), British test pilot
Wally Hazelden (1941–2019), English footballer

Surnames of English origin